Southern College of Optometry is a private college of optometry in Memphis, Tennessee.

History
Southern College of Optometry (SCO) is a private, non-profit institution founded in 1932. J.J. Horton, an ophthalmologist, established SCO in 1932. The class of 1934 was SCO's first graduation class. Since then, SCO has educated more than 6,000 optometrists from all states and several foreign countries. A new clinical facility was opened in 1953 at its current location, which was later expanded to include a campus of new administrative offices, classrooms and a library.

In 1970, SCO moved into its current structure, which houses multimedia classrooms, laboratories, faculty/administrative offices, the library, a student center, a computer learning resource center and an out-patient clinic known as the Eye Institute. The Eye Center at SCO opened in 2002. The  free-standing eye and vision center now serves up to 60,000 patients a year and is one of the largest facilities of its kind in the United States. There are 70 fully equipped examination rooms, 14 individual spaces for advanced technology-based testing, a retinal laser center, a digital angiography center, a full service optical, and on-site ophthalmology services.

In 2013, the college finished construction on a multimillion expansion program which included new state-of-the-art classrooms, study spaces, and new labs. Lewis N. Reich was named as SCO's seventh President in January 2016 and formally installed in the office in May 2016.

Work
The Eye Center cares for more than 60,000 patients annually, offering diagnosis, treatment of eye diseases and management of chronic eye health and visual disorders. The Eye Center provides a full range of service, including comprehensive eye examinations for patients of all ages. It is one of the largest facilities of its kind in the United States. There are 70 fully equipped examination rooms, 14 individual spaces for advanced technology-based testing, a retinal laser center, a digital angiography center, a full service optical, and on-site ophthalmology services.

Similar to a teaching hospital, The Eye Center is a primary health care facility providing services for patients, mostly from Memphis/Shelby County, West Tennessee, Arkansas & Mississippi. The Eye Center is under the direction of Dr. James E. Venable, vice president for clinical programs, and Dr. Christopher Lievens, chief of staff.

Health care services
As a teaching facility, The Eye Center is divided into service areas, including 
Adult Primary Care Service
Pediatric Primary Care Service
Cornea and Contact Lens Service
Advanced Care Ocular Disease Service
Vision Therapy and Rehabilitation Service
The Technology Center
The Eye Center Optical

The Hayes Center for Practice Excellence
In 2005, Jerry Hayes and his wife, Cris, funded the establishment of the Hayes Center for Practice Excellence at SCO. With matching funds committed by SCO's Board of Trustees, an endowment was created to support the Hayes Center in its mission to serve the optometric profession as the premier resource for practice management education.

Notable alumni
Gil Morgan, golfer who played on the PGA Tour and now often competes on the Champions Tour.
Joshua McAdams, runner who competed in Beijing during the 2008 Summer Olympics.
James Morrison, member of the Kansas House of Representatives.
John Boozman, Senior US Senator from Arkansas.
James A. Boucher, former US Representative of Albany County, Wyoming

See also
List of Optometry schools in the world

References

External links
Official website

Universities and colleges in Memphis, Tennessee
Optometry schools in the United States
Private universities and colleges in Tennessee
Educational institutions established in 1932
Universities and colleges accredited by the Southern Association of Colleges and Schools
1932 establishments in Tennessee